Frederick W. Sims (July 23, 1862 – February 8, 1925) was born in Louisa County, Virginia during the height of the American Civil War. As a youth, he learned to work diligently for everything, even though he was a frail boy. He received his early education in the local private and public schools and, later, at the University of Virginia. He was forced to leave the university shortly after his entrance, however, when his father died. Because of his desire to be a lawyer, he studied long hours and was admitted to the bar in 1885. He began practice at Louisa and, just six years later, was elected judge of the county court. This position was held until the county courts were abolished in February 1904. After leaving the bench of the county court, he returned to private practice until November 1905, when he was elected to the Virginia State Senate. Shortly after his term as senator expired, he was elected Mayor of Louisa and filled this office for several years. His health became much worse a few years later, but he continued working. On March 6, 1917, Judge Sims was elected to the Supreme Court of Appeals and, on February 1, 1924, became president of that court. He served as president less than a year before he was granted a leave because of his health, and died before he could return to the court.

Notes

Mayors of places in Virginia
Justices of the Supreme Court of Virginia
1862 births
1925 deaths
Virginia state senators
Virginia lawyers
University of Virginia alumni
People from Louisa County, Virginia
19th-century American lawyers
19th-century American judges
20th-century American lawyers
20th-century American judges
20th-century American politicians
People from Louisa, Virginia